The Prince Leopold Island Migratory Bird Sanctuary is a migratory bird sanctuary in Qikiqtaaluk, Nunavut, Canada. It is located on Prince Leopold Island within Lancaster Sound at the junction of Prince Regent Inlet and Barrow Strait. It was established in 1992 and is classified Category IV by the International Union for Conservation of Nature. It is 31,100 hectares in size, and has a flat, rocky surface with vertical exposed sedimentary rock cliffs nearly all the way around the island.

Other designations
The island is a Key Migratory Bird Terrestrial Habitat site (NU Site 15) and is classified as a Canadian Important Bird Area (#NU006).  The MBS is situated within the IBA.

References

Bird sanctuaries of Qikiqtaaluk Region
Important Bird Areas of Qikiqtaaluk Region
Migratory Bird Sanctuaries of Canada
Important Bird Areas of Arctic islands
Seabird colonies